The 2019–20 season was Dundee United's 111th season, having been founded as Dundee Hibernian in 1909. It was their fourth season in the Scottish Championship, having been relegated from the Scottish Premiership at the end of the 2015–16 season. United also competed in the Challenge Cup, League Cup and Scottish Cup. On 15 April, the SPFL voted to end the lower leagues in Scottish football due to the coronavirus pandemic and as a result Dundee United were declared champions and secured promotion to the Premiership after four years in the Championship.

Competitions

Results & fixtures

Pre-season

Scottish Championship

Scottish League Cup

Scottish Challenge Cup

Scottish Cup

Squad statistics
The table below shows the number of appearances and goals scored by each player.

Appearances

|-
|colspan="12"|Players who left the club during the 2019–20 season
|-

|}

Club statistics

League table

League cup table

Transfers

Players in

Players out

Loans in

Loans out

See also
 List of Dundee United F.C. seasons

References

Dundee United F.C. seasons
Dundee United